The 1971 All-Ireland Senior Club Camogie Championship for the leading clubs in the women's team field sport of camogie was by Austin Stacks from Dublin, who defeated Thurles from Tipperary in the final, played at Croke Park.

Arrangements
The championship was organised on the traditional provincial system used in Gaelic Games since the 1880s, with Portglenone and Ballinasloe winning the championships of the other two provinces.

The Final
Pauline Brennan and Anne Sheehy got two goals each and Rita Halpin a fifth in Austin Stacks 12-point victory in the final. Stacks led 3-2 to 1-1 at half-time.
Agnes Hourigan wrote in the Irish Press: The winners were a better trained side, showing a finer understanding and better teamwork, though the Tipperary girls had some fine strikers, but they were anxious to lift the ball even when a ground strike would have been m ore effective. The Tipperary girls had their best period just after the interval and it looked as if they were getting on top when they goaled to cut the margin to four points, but Austin Stacks recovered and, lasting better, they dominated the closing stages to win comfortably.

Provincial stages

Final stages

References

External links
 Camogie Association

1971 in camogie
1971